Erik Cummins (born 10 August 1988) is a Dutch football player who plays as a goalkeeper for Lisse.

Club career
He formerly played for FC Utrecht.

In August 2014, he became the first goalkeeper to score in the Eredivisie since 2005 when he netted against SBV Excelsior.

References

External links
 Voetbal International profile 

1988 births
Living people
Footballers from Rotterdam
Dutch footballers
Association football goalkeepers
FC Utrecht players
Go Ahead Eagles players
SC Cambuur players
FC Lisse players
Eredivisie players
Eerste Divisie players
Derde Divisie players